Kondor is a Hungarian surname. Notable people with the surname include:
Béla Kondor (1931–1972), Hungarian painter, prose writer, poet, photographer, and avant-garde graphic artist
Duško Kondor (1947–2007), Bosnian Serb human rights activist
Robbie Kondor, American composer, session musician, and arranger
Vilmos Kondor (born 1954), Hungarian author

Surnames from nicknames

Hungarian-language surnames